Tai Che is a village in the Siu Lek Yuen area of Sha Tin District, Hong Kong.

Administration
Tai Che is a recognized village under the New Territories Small House Policy.

History
At the time of the 1911 census, the population of Tai Che was 18. The number of males was 7.

References

External links

 Delineation of area of existing village Wong Nai Tau, Tai Che and Fa Sham Hang (Sha Tin) for election of resident representative (2019 to 2022)

Villages in Sha Tin District, Hong Kong
Siu Lek Yuen